Rivers of Life (known as Ríos de Vida in Spanish) is a group of approximately eighty evangelical churches around the world.

The name "Rivers of Life" should be distinguished from "River of Life" of which there are several other churches and organisations around the world using this title in their church or organisations' name - most notably "River of Life International" which was founded in the U.K. in 1995 and now has churches, schools and orphanages in Africa and India including a Bible College in Kenya.

As regards "Rivers of Life" there are currently Churches in the following countries: United Kingdom, Spain, France, Netherlands, Argentina, Paraguay, Chile, Bolivia, Colombia, El Salvador, Cuba, Panama and the United States.

As well as the churches previously mentioned, Rivers of Life has 4 Bible Colleges, 2 Children's Homes, a School with approximately 600 students and an FM radio station (FM Victoria) amongst other ministries set up to serve the churches purposes and in turn to benefit the local community.

For Rivers of Life's 40th anniversary, the mayor of Quilmes, Sergio Villordo visited the church in Quilmes; the first Rivers of Life church. The mayor expressed his solidarity with Rivers of Life and praised the church for staying faithful to the city even though the church had now spread around the world.

History 
Rivers of Life was founded in 1967 in Quilmes, a suburb of Buenos Aires, Argentina by Jorge Pradas and Oscar Mirón both Spanish nationals along with others. Oscar Mirón had moved to Argentina to flee the persecution of evangelical Christians in Spain under Francisco Franco. He fled the country after he had been a target in an attempted assassination. When the church began, he opened up his workshop for church meetings to be held there. Jorge Pradas was the main leader of the church at the time.

The church in Quilmes now has approximately 1,000 members. By the 1970s, churches had been established in Europe.

Beliefs
Rivers of Life holds to the orthodox Christian faith. It is a free, evangelical and charismatic Church.

It practices believer's baptism, the Lord's Supper, the Spiritual gifts and the New Testament reality of Christ's Church.

It believes in Almighty God, Father, Son and Holy Spirit; in the full divinity, atoning death and bodily resurrection of the Lord Jesus Christ.

It believes that the Bible is God's authoritative Word fully inspired by the Holy Spirit.

Rivers of Life accepts and adheres to the universally accepted creeds of the Christian faith: the Apostles' Creed, the Athanasian Creed and the Nicene Creed. (Where the word catholic is used in these creeds it means its dictionary definition of 'universal' (i.e. Universal church).

Bible Houses

Rivers of Life believe that as well as secular preparation for life, e.g., a university degree, Christians need to be prepared in other ways such as service, living in community and studying the Bible. For this reason Bible Houses were formed. Bible House is a bible college with the vision of preparing young people in areas mentioned above not just academically. The name "Bible House" highlights the fact that nearly all the students live in the same hall of residence. The standard course lasts for two years.

The following table give basic current information about Rivers of Life Bible Houses:

In Oxford, UK there are two community houses but no Bible House.

All the Bible Houses are situated closed to a Rivers of Life Church and the students attend all the church services. The Bible House students also serve the church in every way possible.

References

External links
 Rivers of Life, Oxford
 Bangor Community Church, Wales
  Rivers of Life, Reus, Spain
  Rivers of Life, Argentina
  Bible House, Quilmes
  FM Victoria (Rivers of Life radio station, Quilmes
  Rivers of Life, Amsterdam
  Rivers of Life, The Netherlands
  Rivers of Life, central Buenos Aires
  Familia de Jesús, – Church in El Salvador associated with Rivers of Life churches

Christian organizations established in 1967
Non-denominational Evangelical unions
Quilmes